Fernando Díaz de la Vega (born 12 January 1953) is a Mexican lawyer and politician from the Institutional Revolutionary Party. From 2000 to 2003 he served as Deputy of the LVIII Legislature of the Mexican Congress representing Sinaloa, previously serving as municipal president of Salvador Alvarado.

References

1953 births
Living people
Politicians from Sinaloa
Institutional Revolutionary Party politicians
20th-century Mexican politicians
21st-century Mexican politicians
Deputies of the LVIII Legislature of Mexico
Members of the Chamber of Deputies (Mexico) for Sinaloa
People from Guamúchil
National Autonomous University of Mexico alumni
20th-century Mexican lawyers
Municipal presidents in Sinaloa